Cat Person is a psychological thriller film directed by Susanna Fogel. Written by Michelle Ashford, it is based on the 2017 short story of the same name written by Kristen Roupenian for The New Yorker. It stars Emilia Jones, Nicholas Braun, Geraldine Viswanathan, Hope Davis, Fred Melamed and Isabella Rossellini.

Cat Person premiered at the 2023 Sundance Film Festival on January 21, 2023.

Premise
20-year-old sophomore college student Margot has a brief relationship with Robert, an older man who frequently visits the movie theater where she works.

Cast
 Emilia Jones as Margot
 Nicholas Braun as Robert
 Geraldine Viswanathan as Taylor
 Hope Davis as Kelly
 Michael Gandolfini as Peter
 Liza Koshy as Beth
 Fred Melamed as Dr. Resnick
 Isaac Cole Powell as Clay
 Isabella Rossellini as Dr. Enid Zabala
 Donald Elise Watkins as James Madley
 Liza Colón-Zayas as Officer Elaine

Production
"Cat Person" is a viral 2017 short story written by Kristen Roupenian for The New Yorker. On June 20, 2021, StudioCanal and Imperative Entertainment announced they would be partnering in adapting the short story into a psychological thriller, with Susanna Fogel directing from a screenplay by Michelle Ashford, and Nicholas Braun and Emilia Jones attached to star. In October 2021, Geraldine Viswanathan, Hope Davis, Michael Gandolfini, Liza Koshy, Fred Melamed, Isaac Cole Powell, Isabella Rossellini, and Donald Elise Watkins joined the cast. Production began on October 14, 2021. Filming took place in Jersey City and Newark, New Jersey.

Release
The film premiered at the 2023 Sundance Film Festival on January 21, 2023. It received lowball distribution offers from Netflix, Bleeker Street and Open Road Films, to the disappointment of talent and financiers.

Reception 
On review aggregator website Rotten Tomatoes, the film has an approval rating of 45% based on 64 reviews, with an average rating of 5.5/10. The critics' consensus reads: "Feasting fancifully on its own coarse innovations, Cat Person is a drawn-out adaptation that doesn't land on its feet." On Metacritic, it has a weighted average score of 54 out of 100 based on 22 critics, indicating "mixed or average reviews".

References

External links
 

American psychological thriller films
Films based on short fiction
StudioCanal films
2020s English-language films
2023 independent films
Films shot in New Jersey
Films shot in Newark, New Jersey